Ceglie Messapica is a town, and comune, located in the province of Brindisi and region of Apulia, in southern Italy, in the traditional area called Salento.

Geography 
The area of Ceglie Messapica is located between the Murge and the Upper Salento: its typical elements include trulli, farms, lamie (typical southern single room square dwellings), rupestrian churches, Carsic caves, dolinas, specchie and paretoni (remains of city walls), dry-stone walls, olive groves, vineyards, maquis shrub, ancient oak trees, cattle pastures and arable land.

History 
According to legend, it was founded by the Pelasgi, to whom belonged the megalithic structures known as specchie. After the arrival of Greek colonists around 700 BC, it received the name of Kailìa.  Nearby the village were extraurban sanctuaries dedicated to the God Apollo (near the modern church of San Rocco) and Venus (on the Montevicoli hill).

The city was the military capital of the Messapi (the civil capital being located in the nearby Oria), and fought against the Greek city Taranto in the latter's attempt to gain a passage to the Adriatic Sea. The Messapic Ceglie had some 40,000 inhabitants. In Roman times it was already decaying, and in the Middle Ages was a small village known as Celie de Galdo, with a little castle. After several minor families, in 1584 its fief was given to the Sanseverino family, who enlarged the castle and founded two convents for the Capuchines (now disappeared) and for the Dominicans.

Main sights 
Numerous archaeological remains of the ancient Messapi civilization were found in Ceglie's area.

Events

The Procession and Feast of Saint Anthony of Padua, on 13 June.
The Procession and Feast of Saint Roch, on 17 August.
Ceglie Food Festival, dedicated to gastronomy, on August
Coppa Messapica, cycling race in the Itria valley

Gallery

References
 Notes

External links 
 Ceglie Messapica -Salento high coast of the trulli  
 Ceglie Messapica - Town of the ancient world 

Cities and towns in Apulia
Localities of Salento
Castles in Italy